John Hardy (1773 – 29 September 1855) was a British businessman, barrister and Member of Parliament. By marriage to Lady Isabel Gathorne, he was the founder of the Gathorne-Hardy family.

Hardy was a barrister, Recorder of Leeds for 27 years and the main owner of the Low Moor ironworks.  He represented Bradford in the House of Commons from 1832 to 1837 and from 1841 to 1847. His father, John Hardy (1745-1806), who made successful investments in the Low Moor ironworks, was an attorney at Horsforth and Land Steward to the Spencer-Stanhope family. His father and grandfather had also been Stewards and Clerk to the Stanhope family of Horsforth.

Born in Horsforth on the 11th of October 1773, John Hardy was educated in Switzerland near Bienne, where his contemporaries included John Singleton Copley, 1st Baron Lyndhurst and Daniel O'Connell. Hardy lived in Switzerland before returning home for the Bar. He married in 1804 Isabel, daughter and heiress of Richard Gathorne. Their eldest son John was created a Baronet in 1876 and their third son Gathorne became a prominent Conservative politician and was created Earl of Cranbrook in 1892. Hardy died at Dunstall Hall, Staffordshire on 29 September 1855.

See also
Hardy Baronets, of Dunstall Hall
Earl of Cranbrook

Notes

References
Kidd, Charles, Williamson, David (editors). Debrett's Peerage and Baronetage (1990 edition). New York: St Martin's Press, 1990,

External links 

 

1773 births
1855 deaths
Members of the Parliament of the United Kingdom for English constituencies
UK MPs 1832–1835
UK MPs 1835–1837
UK MPs 1841–1847
Gathorne-Hardy family
Politicians from Bradford